Kassidi may refer to:

Kelli Kassidi, alias of voice actor Megan Hollingshead
An alternative spelling for Cassidy